Garth William Smith (born June 8, 1960) is a pianist/composer/musician accomplished in several styles of music including rock, country, classical and jazz.  His current endeavor is creating spiritually uplifting piano arrangements of popular LDS Hymns.  After living for many years in Oceanside, California, he currently resides in Bella Vista, Arkansas, and is a member of the Church of Jesus Christ of Latter-day Saints (LDS Church).

Early life and education 
Garth was born in Brigham City, Utah, the son of a senior executive chemical engineer working at Thiokol, G. Ray and JoAnne (Petty) Smith. After taking a short break to serve a mission to the Navajo people of Northern Arizona, Smith completed a college degree in Design Engineering Technology from Brigham Young University, graduating in the class of 1988. Afterwards, Smith accepted a position at Intergraph Corporation in Huntsville, Alabama. Later he moved to Carlsbad, California, to accept a design position with Callaway Golf.

Music career 

Smith began his classical musical training on the piano at the age of 5. As a missionary and college student he would entertain many with his piano skills, including a special performance of a Beethoven sonata to over 15,000 people in the BYU Marriott Center at his college graduation.

Smith has been a member of the American Society of Composers, Authors, and Publishers (ASCAP) and the Nashville Songwriters Association International. In 1999 he was the recipient of the California Country Music Association (CCMA) "Song of the Year" award for the song "Last Call." He has also performed as a keyboardist in jazz, rock, and country bands.

Nashville Era 
While living in Alabama, Smith was introduced "Writers in the Round" at the famous Bluebird Cafe in Nashville, Tennessee, a club famous for intimate, acoustic music performed by its composers. Soon, Smith was active participant there, performing his own original compositions.

Smith also participated as both a rehearsal and performance pianist in the local community theaters of Huntsville. He also joined in various local bands touring throughout Northern Alabama and Southern Tennessee. They also participated in local music festivals including Huntsville's annual Panoply Arts Festival.

California Era 
Relocating to Southern California in 1996, Smith continued playing in country bands, as well as developing his songwriting abilities. His bands have played at many popular venues such as the Viejas Casino and the San Diego County Fair.

LDS hymns 
By 2014, Smith had turned his music to creating artistic arrangements of popular gospel hymns of the LDS Church, producing several albums, music videos and other related works. His work is available through Deseret Book.

Album #1: Sacred Hymns 
Recently Smith has turned his attention to recording original arrangements of popular LDS hymns, releasing this first album in 2014 titled Sacred Hymns Arranged and Performed on the Piano. This has received great acclaim and wide national distribution within the LDS music genre.

Album #2: Temples 
For his second full-length album, How Beautiful Thy Temples, Sacred Hymns, Vol. II (released in 2015), Smith brings his masterful, reverent signature style to bear on hymns and sacred songs that focus on the beauty and eternal significance of temples. This has been his most successful release yet, having charted nationally at #21 on the iTunes Gospel new music chart.

Crawford Gates, famous LDS composer, has called "How Beautiful Thy Temples" a "fabulous recording." Smith's arrangement of Gates's beloved Easter hymn "He is Not Here" (from "The Choirbook") is included as track 8 on the album.

From "An Angel From on High," an arrangement inspired by the statue of the angel Moroni that sits atop many temples, to the Children's Songbook classic "I Love To See the Temple". It's the perfect music to set the tone around your home on the Sabbath or to invite the Spirit more fully into your life day-to-day.

Album #3: Great Redeemer 
On 1 September 2016, Smith released his third album of LDS hymn arrangements, a collection of fresh, new arrangements of about the Saviour, Jesus Christ, titled Behold the Great Redeemer, Sacred Hymns, Vol. III. A new addition is the release of his original sheet music so that now other experienced pianists can perform this genre music in church worship services and other religious settings.   Selections include Lead, Kindly Light, In Humility our Saviour, and another Crawford Gates masterpiece, Our Saviour's Love.

"The bottom line is this—Smith's music takes you to a place of serenity, an escape from the world for a moment, and provides the listener with beautiful arrangements that point to the Savior."

Album #4: A Sacred Christmas 
Released in time for the 2017  Christmas season, A Sacred Christmas, this album features a variety of his favorite hymns that commemorate the birth of the Saviour. This album features several guest artists, Calee Reed, Michael Dowdle, One Voice Children's Choir, Sun Valley Carolers and others that add an extra layer of inspiration.

Music firesides 
Smith frequently travels the country performing free, inspirational music firesides. His 60-minute presentation explores gospel principles found in eight hymns that includes the restoration, prayer, sacrament, forgiveness, and most importantly, the atonement of Jesus Christ.

The multimedia presentation features a Christ-centered narrative, live piano, video clips from prophets and apostles, and artwork from other LDS artists.

Gospel Music Videos 
Smith's piano is a backdrop featured in many gospel music videos produced directly by or for the LDS Church, including the church's recent #LIGHTtheWORLD Christmas season service message. The most popular of these videos is the Heaven's Hallelujah arrangement featuring vocalist Lauren Sullivan. Many of these are accessible for free on their YouTube Channel.   
 Garth Smith Music - YouTube Channel

Other performances 
Another first ever event occurred for Smith on 9 September 2016, with the production of his online concert on Facebook Live on the Moroni Channel.

Honors and awards 
Smith is the recipient of the following awards and honors:
 2019 "Inspirational Artist of the Year", presented by the Inspirational Arts Association based in Salt Lake City, Utah. This award was shared with "Advocate of the Arts" award winner President Russell M. Nelson, President of the Church and "Patrons of the Arts" award winners Elder and Sister Tad R. Callister.

External links 
 GarthSmithMusic.com – Official Website
 Garth W Smith – Bio on MormonMusic.org
 GarthSmithMusic – Facebook 
 Music Channel – YouTube Channel
 Garth Smith – Deseret Books Featured Artist

References 

1960 births
20th-century American composers
20th-century Mormon missionaries
20th-century American pianists
American male composers
American Latter Day Saint hymnwriters
American Mormon missionaries in the United States
American performers of Christian music
American male pianists
American YouTubers
Brigham Young University alumni
Latter Day Saints from Alabama
Christmas music
Living people
Latter Day Saints from Utah
Latter Day Saints from California
Music YouTubers
Musicians from Utah
People from Brigham City, Utah
Religious music